The Chinese hare (Lepus sinensis) is a species of mammal in the family Leporidae. It is found in China, Taiwan and Vietnam.

Taxonomy
The Chinese hare was first described by John Edward Gray in 1832. The Korean hare (Lepus coreanus) was at one time considered to be a subspecies of the Chinese hare but molecular studies of mtDNA have since shown that the Korean hare is in fact a separate species.

Description
The fur is short and coarse, the back and chest being chestnut-brown and the belly whitish. The large hind feet are furred, the tail is brown and the tips of the ears bear triangular black patches. It is distinguished from other Lepus species by the shape and details of its skull and teeth.

Distribution and habitat
The Chinese hare is native to the provinces of Anhui, Fujian, Guangdong, Guangxi, Guizhou, Hunan, Jiangsu, Jiangxi and Zhejiang in China. It also occurs on the island of Taiwan and in a separate small area of northeastern Vietnam.

Biology
The Chinese hare has been little studied but like other hare species, the diet consists of grasses and other green plant material, buds, twigs and bark. It is mainly nocturnal and produces two types of faeces, moist and dry pellets. It eats the moist pellets immediately so as to extract the maximum nutritional value from its food. It does not live underground in a burrow but has a form or nest in long vegetation. A litter of about three precocial young are born in this and visited by the mother once a day for a few minutes to allow them to suckle. The mother's milk is particularly rich in protein and fat and the lactation period lasts for about three weeks. Various carnivores prey on the Chinese hare and it relies on its fast running speed to escape from predators.

Status
The IUCN lists the Chinese hare in its Red List of Threatened Species as being of "Least Concern" as it has a wide range. However, in Vietnam it occurs in a heavily populated area and is at risk from hunting. In China, its population trend is unknown.

References

Lepus
Mammals described in 1832
Taxa named by John Edward Gray
Mammals of China
Mammals of Taiwan
Mammals of Vietnam
Taxonomy articles created by Polbot